Patrick James Donahue (April 15, 1849 – October 4, 1922) was an English-born prelate of the Roman Catholic Church. He served as bishop of the Diocese of Wheeling  in West Virginia from 1894 until his death in 1922.

Biography

Early life 
Patrick Donahue was born on April 15, 1849 in Little Malvern, Worcestershire, in the United Kingdom. He became a student at St. Michael's Priory in Hereford, England, at age 14 and entered St. Gregory's College near Bath, England two years later. After graduating in 1869, he taught English and mathematics. 

In 1873, Donahue immigrated to the United States and settled in Washington, D.C. He enrolled at George Washington University Law School and was admitted to the bar in 1876. He then practiced for the next seven years.  In 1883, after deciding to prepare for the priesthood, Donahue entered St. Mary's Seminary in Baltimore, Maryland.

Priesthood 
Donahue was ordained to the priesthood for the Archdiocese of Baltimore by Archbishop James Gibbons on December 19, 1885. After his ordination, Donahue served as an assistant priest at St. John's Parish in Baltimore.  He served as chancellor of the archdiocese from 1886 to 1891, and rector of Assumption of the Blessed Mary Cathedral in Baltimore from 1891 to 1894.

Bishop of Wheeling 
On January 22, 1894, Donahue was appointed the third bishop of the Diocese of Wheeling by Pope Leo XIII. He received his episcopal consecration on April 8, 1894, at Assumption of the Blessed Virgin Mary Cathedral from Cardinal Gibbons, with Bishops John Foley and Leo Haid serving as co-consecrators. 

Donahue established 38 parishes, six missions, four hospitals, two monasteries, an orphanage and several schools in the diocese. He also established the first official diocesan periodical, The Church Calendar, in 1895 and held the sixth diocesan synod in 1899. The number of priests serving the diocese more than tripled and the number of Catholics increased from 20,000 to 62,000. For all these many achievements, he earned the nickname of the "Great Builder."

Donohue's friendship with New York philanthropist Sara Tracy resulted in a large cash donation to found Wheeling Jesuit University in Wheeling.  Tracy and Donahue had met on a transatlantic voyage in 1899 and became friends over a long game of chess.  At the end of the trip, Tracy gave Donahue $5,000 to use in his diocese.  The start of several donations, Tracy bequeathed her estate to Donahue in 1905.

Patrick Donahue died on October 4, 1922 in Wheeling from heart disease at age 72.

References

1849 births
1922 deaths
Roman Catholic bishops of Wheeling–Charleston
19th-century Roman Catholic bishops in the United States
20th-century Roman Catholic bishops in the United States
English emigrants to the United States
George Washington University Law School alumni
People from Malvern, Worcestershire
St. Mary's Seminary and University alumni